Ángel Aragón (August 2, 1890 — January 24, 1952) was a professional baseball player and father of Jack Aragon. Aragón spent his entire Major League Baseball career with the New York Yankees. He played in the Cuban League from 1912 to 1920. Besides, he was also the first Cuban and Latin American player to wear a Yankees uniform.

References

External links

Baseball Reference (MLB) 
Baseball Reference (Minors)
The Deadball Era (obituary)

1890 births
1952 deaths
Danville Leafs players
Habana players
High Point Pointers players
Long Branch Cubans players
Major League Baseball players from Cuba
Cuban expatriate baseball players in the United States
Major League Baseball third basemen
Memphis Chickasaws players
New York Yankees players
Richmond Climbers players
Richmond Colts players
Scranton Miners players
Baseball players from Havana
Toledo Iron Men players
Winston-Salem Twins players
Burials at Gate of Heaven Cemetery (Hawthorne, New York)